James Ray Dixon (born August 1, 1928, in Houston, Texas – died January 10, 2015, in Bryan, Texas) was professor emeritus and curator emeritus of amphibians and reptiles at the Texas Cooperative Wildlife Collection at Texas A&M University. He lived in El Campo, Texas throughout most of his childhood. He published prolifically on the subject of herpetology in his distinguished career, authoring and co-authoring several books, book chapters, and numerous peer reviewed notes and articles, describing two new genera, and many new species, earning him a reputation as one of the most prominent herpetologists of his generation. His main research focus was morphology based systematics of amphibians and reptiles worldwide with emphasis on Texas, US, Mexico, Central America, and South America, although bibliographies, conservation, ecology, life history and zoogeography have all been the subjects of his extensive publications.

Eponyms
A genus of lizards, Dixonius , leaf-toed geckos from Southeast Asia, was named in his honor as well as several species of reptiles and amphibians, e.g., the white-lipped peeping frog, Eleutherodactylus dixoni  (= Eleutherodactylus albolabris ); the gray checkered whiptail, Cnemidophorus dixoni  (= Aspidoscelis tesselatus ); Dixon's leaf-toed gecko, Phyllodactylus dixoni ; and the large-eyed snake, Thamnodynastes dixoni .

Education and early career
Dixon attained his Bachelor of Science from Howard Payne University (1950), and then served in the Korean War (1951–1953).  Upon returning from the war, he briefly acted as Curator of Reptiles at the Ross Allen Reptile Institute from 1954 to 1955. He earned his master's degree (1957) and PhD in (1961) from Texas A&M University. He was an associate professor of veterinary medicine at Texas A&M from 1959 until 1961.

Career
From 1961 until 1965 he was an associate professor of wildlife management at New Mexico State University and served as a consultant to the New Mexico state Game and Fisheries department. He was on the faculty of the University of Southern California and from 1965 until 1967 he was Curator of Herpetology at the Life Sciences Division at the Los Angeles County Museum in California. In 1967 he returned to Texas to become a professor at Texas A&M University, teaching wildlife and fisheries science, and curator of the Texas Cooperative Wildlife Collection or TCWC (recently renamed Biodiversity Research and Teaching Collections or BRTC). Over 20 herpetologists earned Ph.D.s studying under him at Texas A&M University. He has also served as president of several herpetological and naturalist societies including The Herpetologist League, Texas Herpetological Society, Texas Academy of Science; Society for the Study of Amphibians and Reptiles, Southwestern Association of Naturalists, and on the board of directors of the Texas Systems of Natural Laboratories.  He has also served on the faculty of Stephen F. Austin State University and Texas State University.

New genera of reptiles described by James R. Dixon
Listed in chronological order.
Crenadactylus  – tiny Australian clawless geckos
Asaccus  – Southwest Asian leaf-toed geckos

A partial list of new amphibian and reptile species described by James R. Dixon
Listed in chronological order.
Eleutherodactylus dilatus  – Guerreran peeping frog
Eleutherodactylus grandis  – great peeping frog
Coleonyx reticulatus  – reticulate banded gecko 
Eleutherodactylus rufescens  – red peeping frog
Phyllodactylus duellmani  – Duellman's pigmy leaf-toed gecko
Phyllodactylus insularis  – Belize leaf-toed gecko
Phyllodactylus paucituberculatus  – Rio Marquez Valley gecko
Ambystoma flavipiperatum  – yellow-peppered salamander
Phyllodactylus davisi  – Davis' leaf-toed gecko
Phyllodactylus nocticolus  – peninsula leaf-toed gecko
Eleutherodactylus nivicolimae  – Nevado de Colima chirping frog
Phyllodactylus angelensis  – Angel Island leaf-toed gecko
Phyllodactylus apricus  – Las Animas Island gecko
Phyllodactylus bugastrolepis  – Catalina Island leaf-toed gecko
Phyllodactylus partidus  – Isla Partida Norte leaf-toed gecko
Phyllodactylus santacruzensis  – Santa Cruz leaf-toed gecko
Phyllodactylus tinklei  – Raza Island leaf-toed gecko
Phyllodactylus palmeus  – Honduras leaf-toed gecko
Phyllodactylus angustidigitus  – narrow leaf-toed gecko
Phyllodactylus clinatus  – Cerro Illescas gecko
Phyllodactylus interandinus  – Andes leaf-toed gecko
Phyllodactylus johnwrighti  – Rio Huancabamba leaf-toed gecko
Phyllodactylus kofordi  – coastal leaf-toed gecko
Phyllodactylus pumilus  – leaf-toed gecko
Phyllodactylus sentosus  – Lima leaf-toed gecko
Pseudogonatodes peruvianus  – Peru clawed gecko
Sceloporus exsul  – Queretaran desert spiny lizard
Hypsiglena tanzeri  – Tanzer's night snake
Bachia huallagana  – Dixon's bachia
Asaccus griseonotus  – gray-marked gecko
Rhachisaurus brachylepis  – Dixon's antosaura
Anotosaura vanzolinia  – Vanzolini's antosaura
Helicops yacu  – Peru keelback
Bachia guianensis  – Guyana bachia
Erythrolamprus pyburni  – Pyburn's tropical forest snake
Typhlops minuisquamus  – basin worm snake
Typhlops paucisquamus  – Pernambuco worm snake
Kentropyx vanzoi  – Gallagher's kentropyx
Neusticurus medemi  – Medem's neisticurus
Erythrolamprus andinus  – ground snake
Liotyphlops argaleus  – ground snake
Erythrolamprus atraventer  – Dixon's ground snake
Erythrolamprus maryellenae  – Mary Ellen's ground snake
Lygophis vanzolinii  – Vanzolini's ground snake
Cnemidophorus gramivagus  – whiptail lizard
Erythrolamprus ceii  – Cei's ground snake
Sceloporus chaneyi  – Chaney's bunchgrass lizard
Chironius laurenti  – Laurent's sipo
Chironius septentrionalis  – South American sipo
Tantilla johnsoni  – Chiapan centipede snake
Erythrolamprus janaleeae  – ground snake
Erythrolamprus vitti  – Vitt's ground snake
Micrurus tamaulipensis  – Sierra de Tamaulipas coral snake
Lampropeltis webbi  – Webb's kingsnake
Pristimantis waoranii  – South American rain frog

Nota bene: A binomial authority in parentheses indicates that the species was originally described in a different genus.

References

External links and further reading
Altig R (2012). "Academic Lineages of Doctoral Degrees in Herpetology (third edition)". pp. 471–564. In: Adler K (2012). Contributions to the History of Herpetology. Society for the Study of Amphibians and Reptiles. 564 pp.
Bailey JR, Thomas RA (2007). "A revision of the South American snake genus Thamnodynastes Wagler, 1830 (Serpentes, Colubridae, Tachymenini). II. Three new species from northern South America, with further descriptions of Thamnodynastes gambotensis Pérez-Santos and Moreno and Thamnodynastes ramonriveroi Manzanilla & Sánchez". Memoria de la Fundación La Salle de Ciencias Naturales 166: 7-27.
Bauer AM, Good DA, Branch WR (1997). "The taxonomy of the Southern African leaf-toed geckos (Squamata: Gekkonidae), with a review of Old World "Phyllodactylus" and the description of five new genera". Proc. California Acad. Sci. 49 (14): 447–497.
Beltz, Ellin (2006). Biographies of People Honored in the Herpetological Nomenclature in North America

Hibbitts, Toby J.; Vaughan, R. Kathryn; Sites, Jack W. Jr; Fitzgerald, Lee A. (2018). "James Ray Dixon (1928–2015)". Herpetological Review 49 (1): 168–174.
Lynch JD (1991). "Three replacement names for preoccupied names in the genus Eleutherodactylus(Amphibia: Leptodactylidae)". Copeia 1991: 1138–1139.

Rivero-Blanco C, Lancini AR (1968) (1967). "Phyllodactylus dixoni: una nueva especie de lagarto (Sauria: Gekkoninae) de Venezuela ". Memoria de la Sociedad de Ciencias Naturales La Salle 78: 168−175. (in Spanish).
Scudday JF (1973). "A New Species of Lizard of the Cnemidophorus tesselatus Group from Texas". Journal of Herpetology 7 (4): 363–371.
Smith HM, Smith RB (1973). Synopsis of the Herpetofauna of Mexico, Vol. II: Analysis of the Literature Exclusive of the Mexican Axolotl. Augusta, West Virginia: Eric Lundberg. xxxiii + 367 pp.
Texas Cooperative Wildlife Collection

American herpetologists
1928 births
2015 deaths
American biologists
Howard Payne University alumni
Texas A&M University alumni
20th-century American zoologists
People from Houston
People from El Campo, Texas